The Mushroom is the name of a lava flow located in the Yukon Territory that was erupted during the Pliocene period in the Northern Cordilleran Volcanic Province.

See also
Volcanism of Canada
Volcanism of Western Canada
List of volcanoes in Canada
Northern Cordilleran Volcanic Province

References

Volcanism of Yukon
Lava flows